Theresa Obumneme Okoli  is the 4th substantive provost of Federal College of Education (Technical), Umunze. On 17th of May 2018, she was appointed by the President of Nigeria, Muhammadu Buhari, to replace the acting provost of the college, Dr. Cicilia Nonye Ibekwe.

Early life and education
Theresa was born to the Aniagboso family in the village of Okpuifite, Agulu, Anaocha Local Government Area, Anambra State. She started her education at St. Augustine's Primary 
School, Ogun State and from 1971–1984 continued at Girls Secondary School, Awgbu, Anambra State, where she obtained the West African Senior School Certificate (WASSCE). She proceeded to Anambra State College of Education (now, Nwafor Orizu College of Education, Nsugbe, Anambra State), where she graduated from the Department of Agric Education in 1988. She obtained her B.S. degree in Agric Education in 1990 from the University of Nigeria, Nsukka. She also obtained her Master's degree from the same university in 1995. In 2011, she got her doctoral degree from Enugu State University of Science and Technology.

Career
On 3 March 1992, Theresa started her career with the Federal College of Education (Technical), Umunze as an assistant lecturer in the department of Agricultural Education, she became a principal lecturer in 2007 and later chief lecturer on 1 October 2011. She served as the Dean, School of Agriculture and Home Economics Education, Dean, Students Affairs, Coordinator, Sandwich Programme, Coordinator, Continuing Education Programme (CEP), Head of Department, Agricultural Education. She is a member of many professional associations, such as Science Teachers Association of Nigeria (STAN), Nigeria Association of Teacher of Technology (NATT), Teachers Registration Council of Nigeria (TRCN), Women in Colleges of Education (WICE) and Nigerian Institute of Management (NIM). She is the National Secretary of Association of Women in Colleges of Education (WICE). She is also the Chairman, Forum for African Women Educationalist of Nigeria (FAWEN), FCET Umunze Chapter.

Appointment as provost
On 17 May 2018, the then President of Nigeria, Muhammadu Buhari, appointed her as the 4th substantive provost of Federal College of Education (Technical), Umunze to replace the Acting provost of the college, Dr. Cicilia Nonye Ibekwe, thus making her the first staff of the college to get to the career peak as Provost.

Awards and honours
In 2019, she was honoured with a distinguished labour-friendly award by Colleges of Education Academic Staff Union, (COEASU)  and distinguished alumni award by the University of Nigeria, Nsukka. She was conferred with a chieftaincy title, Mma Chinyereugo of Orumba (Jewel from God) by the Orumba Traditional Rulers Council, Anambra State.

References

Living people
University of Nigeria alumni
Enugu State University of Science and Technology alumni
Igbo educators
Igbo academics
Nigerian academics
People from Anambra State
Place of birth missing (living people)
Date of birth missing (living people)
Nigerian Christians
Year of birth missing (living people)